Dennis Novikov was the defending champion but lost in the third round to Renzo Olivo.

Matías Franco Descotte won the title after defeating Gonzalo Escobar 6–1, 6–4 in the final.

Seeds
All seeds receive a bye into the second round.

Draw

Finals

Top half

Section 1

Section 2

Bottom half

Section 3

Section 4

References
Main draw
Qualifying draw

2019 ATP Challenger Tour
2019 Singles